Anthony Perez (born 22 April 1991) is a French cyclist, who currently rides for UCI WorldTeam . He was named in the startlist for the 2017 Vuelta a España. In July 2018, he was named in the start list for the Tour de France.

Major results

2012
 5th Time trial, National Under-23 Road Championships
2013
 4th Road race, Jeux de la Francophonie
2015
 1st  Sprints classification, Tour des Pays de Savoie
2017
 Tour du Gévaudan Languedoc-Roussillon
1st  Points classification
1st Stage 2
 3rd Overall Tour de Luxembourg
1st Stage 3
2018
 1st  Mountains classification, Route d'Occitanie
 7th Overall Tour de Yorkshire
 9th Overall Tour de Luxembourg
1st Stage 4
 10th Overall Tour de l'Ain
2019
 2nd Duo Normand (with Christophe Laporte)
2020
 1st Stage 1 Tour des Alpes-Maritimes et du Var
2021
 1st  Mountains classification, Paris–Nice
 3rd Polynormande
 4th Mercan'Tour Classic
  Combativity award Stage 17 Tour de France
2022
 1st Classic Loire Atlantique
 5th Route Adélie
  Combativity award Stage 4 Tour de France
2023
 1st La Drôme Classic
 2nd Cholet-Pays de la Loire
 9th Overall Étoile de Bessèges
 9th Overall Tour des Alpes-Maritimes et du Var

Grand Tour general classification results timeline

References

External links

1991 births
Living people
French male cyclists
Sportspeople from Toulouse
Cyclists from Occitania (administrative region)